Karstein Hansen (born 19 June 1932) is a Norwegian politician for the Progress Party. He served as a deputy representative to the Norwegian Parliament from Nordland during the terms 1997–2001 and 2001–2005. In total he met during 53 days of parliamentary session.

References

1932 births
Living people
Deputy members of the Storting
Progress Party (Norway) politicians
Nordland politicians
Place of birth missing (living people)
20th-century Norwegian politicians
21st-century Norwegian politicians